Eois laxipecten is a moth in the family Geometridae. It is found in the Democratic Republic of Congo and Uganda.

References

Moths described in 2000
Eois
Insects of the Democratic Republic of the Congo
Insects of Uganda
Moths of Africa